The 1978–79 San Francisco Dons men's basketball team represented the University of San Francisco as a member of the West Coast Athletic Conference during the 1978–79 NCAA Division I men's basketball season. The Dons opened the season with a top 20 ranking, but fell out after a couple early season losses. San Francisco battled back to finish the season with a 22–7 record (12–2 WCAC) and a No. 12 ranking in the final AP poll. As champions of the West Coast Athletic Conference, San Francisco played in the NCAA Tournament as No. 4 seed in the West region. To date, this season marks the most recent time the Dons have reached the Sweet Sixteen.

Senior center Bill Cartwright was named conference Player of the Year for the third time and received consensus second-team All-American honors. He ended his career with the Dons as the top scorer and shot blocker (since surpassed) in school history and third on the career rebounding list.

Roster

Schedule and results

|-
!colspan=9 style=| Regular season

|-
!colspan=9 style=| NCAA Tournament

Rankings

Awards and honors
Bill Cartwright – WCAC Player of the Year (3x), Consensus Second-team All-American

Team players drafted into the NBA

References

San Francisco
San Francisco Dons men's basketball seasons
San Francisco
San Francisco Dons
San Francisco Dons